In enzymology, a succinate—CoA ligase (GDP-forming) is an enzyme that catalyzes the chemical reaction

GTP + succinate + CoA  GDP + phosphate + succinyl-CoA

The 3 substrates of this enzyme are GTP, succinate, and CoA, whereas its 3 products are GDP, phosphate, and succinyl-CoA.

This enzyme belongs to the family of ligases, specifically those forming carbon-sulfur bonds as acid-thiol ligases.  The systematic name of this enzyme class is succinate:CoA ligase (GDP-forming). Other names in common use include succinyl-CoA synthetase (GDP-forming), succinyl coenzyme A synthetase (guanosine diphosphate-forming), succinate thiokinase, succinic thiokinase, succinyl coenzyme A synthetase, succinate-phosphorylating enzyme, P-enzyme, SCS, G-STK, succinyl coenzyme A synthetase (GDP-forming), succinyl CoA synthetase, and succinyl coenzyme A synthetase.  This enzyme participates in the citric acid cycle and propanoate metabolism.

Structural studies

References

 Boyer, P.D., Lardy, H. and Myrback, K. (Eds.), The Enzymes, 2nd ed., vol. 6, Academic Press, New York, 1962, p. 387-399.
 
 
 

EC 6.2.1
Enzymes of known structure